Đorđe Mrđanin (Serbian Cyrillic: Ђорђе Мрђанин; born February 26, 1981) is a Serbian football defender.

Career
Beside playing for FK Hajduk Kula where he spend the most of his career, he also played for FK Kabel, OFK Beograd and FK Proleter Zrenjanin in Serbia, Degerfors IF and IFK Norrköping in Sweden and Hungarian Vasas SC.

External links
 Profile at Playerhistory.com
 Profile and stats since 2001 at Srbijafudbal
 Early career at Srbijafudbal

1981 births
Living people
Footballers from Novi Sad
Serbian footballers
OFK Beograd players
FK Proleter Zrenjanin players
FK Hajduk Kula players
Serbian SuperLiga players
Degerfors IF players
IFK Norrköping players
Expatriate footballers in Sweden
Vasas SC players
Expatriate footballers in Hungary
Association football defenders